Boodles is a privately held British luxury jeweller and jewellery designer group founded in 1798. Boodles is a family company located in Liverpool, it also has stores in London, Manchester, Dublin and Chester. Their flagship store is found on New Bond Street, London.

History
Founded as Boodle and Dunthorne, the first shop opened in 1798 in Liverpool. Later, in 1910, it amalgamated with the Wainwright family, owners of another Liverpool jewellers. The business has remained with them ever since.

In 1965 Boodles opened a second store in Chester and a third one in Manchester in 1982. Nicholas and Michael Wainwright took over from their father, Anthony Wainwright, in 1992. Under their stewardship, Boodles opened several stores in London.

Boodles’ first London store opened on Brompton Road opposite Harrods. Later, they moved it to No.1 Sloane Street. Boodles were due to launch their new showroom at No.6 Sloane Street in early 2017. Boodles’ second London store was on Regent Street, and this also moved to Bond St, which is the current Boodles flagship store.

Boodles now has nine stores including five in London: Savoy Hotel, New Bond Street, Sloane Street, The Royal Exchange and Harrods, three in North West England; (Liverpool, Chester and Manchester) and one in Dublin, Ireland.

In late 2015, the Bond Street flagship showroom underwent a major expansion and renovation. It spans over 2,500 square feet.

The family changed the company name from Boodle and Dunthorne to Boodles, and expanded the company to the brand it is today. The company started selling jewellery from its website in summer 2012.

The history of Boodles is the subject of an exhibition at the Lady Lever Art Gallery in Port Sunlight. On display are jewellery and objects relating to the company, including Grand National trophies.

Products

In its early years Boodles, was a silversmith and watchmaker  along with jewellery making. During the 20th century the company provided chronographs and watches to air and naval officers. It also designed and crafted cups for sporting and non-sporting competitions including the solid gold trophy for the winner of the Grand National.

In the second half of the 20th century Boodles emerged as a retailer of bespoke jewellery. The company sources diamonds and other gemstones, and designs its own range of jewellery.

In 2012, the company launched an e-commerce website to sell its goods. This move was taken by the company to expand its products distribution worldwide.

Honours
In 2008, the Boodles Raindance Ring was selected to appear in the Victoria and Albert Museum's permanent jewellery collection and resides there to this day.

Events
The Boodles is a five-day tennis exhibition at Stoke Park in Buckinghamshire, held in the run up to Wimbledon. The event has attracted players such as Novak Djokovic, Rafael Nadal, Andy Murray and Jo-Wilfried Tsonga.

The Boodles Boxing Ball is a biennial charity event held at the Grosvenor Park Hotel on Park Lane in London, with all proceeds going to charities such as the Starlight Children's Foundation and Cancer Research. The ball has raised a total of £1.2 million for various charities since its first event in 2002.

Boodles is the sponsor of the Fred Winter Juvenile Novices' Handicap Hurdle at the Cheltenham Festival, and the Boodles May Festival is a three-day horse race and opener to the Chester Racecourse season.

TV
The TV documentary "The Million Pound Necklace: Inside Boodles" was aired on Channel 4 in 2014 and is following the creation of the Greenfire Suite, a jewellery collection made of emeralds valued at £2.8 Million.

References

Luxury brands
Jewellery retailers of the United Kingdom
British jewellers
Retail companies established in 1798
English brands
Shops in London
Companies based in Liverpool
1798 establishments in England
British companies established in 1798